Ardotalia (also known as Melandra, or Melandra Castle) is a Roman fort in Gamesley, near Glossop in Derbyshire, England.

Ardotalia was constructed by Cohors Primae Frisiavonum—The First Cohort of Frisiavones. Evidence for the existence of this unit exists not only from the building stone found at the site but also from various diplomas and other Roman writings. This unit would have had around a thousand men, including the specialist craftsmen needed to perform the skilled work of building the fort.

This unit was assisted in constructing the fort by the 3rd Cohort of Bracara Augustani. These men were probably Iberian Celts from the colony of Braga in Portugal, who seem to have been attached to the XX Legion Valeria Victrix in Chester. 

Whilst it is unknown which of these Cohorts manned the fort, it seems more likely that the 3rd Cohort of Bracara Augustani performed this duty, as they were from a hilly region and so were more experienced in holding terrain such as that found around Glossop. The Frisiavones were from low-lying lands beyond the Rhine and so may have been divided between the lower terrain of Manchester and Northwich.

The First Cohort of Frisiavones were also present at Brocolitia, one of Hadrian's wall forts and settlements, at Carrawburgh, Northumberland. Evidence for this relies on an inscription on an altar stone, which tells us that Optio Maus (an NCO within the Cohort) had repaid a vow to the goddess Coventina. Whether this altar was the repayment of the vow is unknown.

The name Melandra is of unknown origin but may have been originated by the John Watson, Rector of Stockport, who visited the site c. 1771 when substantial stone remains existed. The name Ardotalia is a hypothetical emendation of Zerdotalia written in the Ravenna Cosmography.  The site is a Scheduled Ancient Monument. , it is on the Heritage at Risk Register, its condition described as "[g]enerally unsatisfactory with major localised problems".

Doctor's Gate Roman road ran between Ardotalia fort and Navio fort at Brough-on-Noe.

References
Notes

Bibliography

History of Derbyshire
Roman fortifications in England
Archaeological sites in Derbyshire
Scheduled monuments in Derbyshire
Roman sites in Derbyshire